Jose C. Vitug (born July 15, 1934) is a Filipino lawyer and jurist who served as an Associate Justice of the Supreme Court of the Philippines. He was appointed to the Court on June 28, 1993 by President Fidel Ramos and retired on July 15, 2004.

Vitug was the Founding Dean of the Angeles University Foundation School of Law. He serves as an Independent Director Aboitiz Equity Ventures. He also served as the Acting Dean of Arellano University-School of Law

Awards
He has received numerous awards including Outstanding Manilan, and Outstanding Kapampangan.

Books
He has authored several books including Compendium of Tax Law and Jurisprudence (co-authored with Ernesto D. Acosta; Pandect of Commercial Law and Jurisprudence; Civil Code of the Philippines Annotated (4 Volumes); Commercial Laws of the Philippines (2 Volumes);and Compendium of Civil Code of the Philippines.

References

External links 

Associate Justices of the Supreme Court of the Philippines
1934 births
People from Batangas
20th-century Filipino judges
Living people
21st-century Filipino lawyers